AONTAS - The Irish National Adult Learning Organisation is an Irish non-governmental organisation for the promotion and facilitation of adult learning. It was founded in 1969 by Fr. Liam Carey of the Dublin Institute of Adult Education, and launched by Brian Lenihan TD. Sean O'Murchu was elected its first president. While it has been a non-governmental body since 1976, it receives funding from the Department of Education and Skills.

The word aontas is Irish for "union", but is also a backronym for Aos Oideachais Náisiúnta Trí Aontú Saorálach, meaning "national adult education through voluntary unification".

Membership of AONTAS includes individuals as well as a number of state bodies such as Education and Training Boards ETBs, community education organisations,  trade unions, Institutes of Technology, providers of learning, and community projects amongst others.

AONTAS produces a number of publications and periodicals such as The Adult Learners Journal as well as research publications. It is a registered charity.

Presidents of Aontas have included Sean O'Murchu (1969), Robert Kelleher(1975), Seamus O'Grady(1980), Kevin McBrien(1883), Brendan Conway(1989), Bernie Brady(1990),  Mairead Wrynn (1993), Dr. Micheál MacGréil SJ(1994), John Ryan (2002), Liz Waters(2012) and Tara Farrell(2018)

See also

 Micheál MacGréil

References

External links
 Official site

Education in the Republic of Ireland
Educational organisations based in the Republic of Ireland
1969 establishments in Ireland